Baba Binod Singh, (d. 1716 A.D.) a descendant of Guru Angad, was an army man and disciple of Guru Gobind Singh and was among few Sikhs who accompanied him to Nanded in 1708. In Budha Dal Chronicles, Guru Gobind Singh made Baba Binod Singh the head of the Khalsa.

Regarding Binod Singh, Kahn Singh Nabha states in Mahankosh:

Alliance with Banda Singh Bahadur

He was one of the five companions of Banda Bahadur (1670-1716) sent by the Guru in 1708 from Nanded to the Punjab to punish Wazir Khan, Nawab of Sirhind.  Binod Singh was Banda Singh's ally in the campaign he launched upon arrival in the Punjab. Binod Singh commanded the left wing of Khalsa Army in the Battle of Chappar Chiri fought in May 1710. After conquest of the province of Sirhind, the frontier district of Karnal, bordering on Delhi territory, was entrusted to Binod Singh. Soon thereafter, in October 1710, Binod Singh fought 4 battles at Tarori, second at Amin, 25 km north of Karnal, third at Thanesar, 8 km farther north, and the fourth at Shahabad, 22 km north of Thanesar.

Differences with Banda Bahadur

 Baba Binod Singh was not agreed to some of aspects. On Hukamnama by Mata Sundri, Binod Singh left Banda Bahadur with other Sikhs and declared themselves as Tatt Khalsa and followers of Banda were called Bandai Khalsa. After Binod Singh and other Sikhs left, Banda Bahadur was captured and prosecuted in Delhi.

Binod Singh came to Goindwal after dispute with Banda Bahadur at Gurdas Nanagal.

Aftermath
According to Khafi Khan, three to four thousand of his men were killed. Binod Singh is believed to have lost his life in this massacre, too. That was to in 1716.

Battles fought by Baba Binod Singh
 Battle of Sonipat
 Battle of Ambala
 Battle of Samana
 Battle of Sadhaura
 Battle of Chappar Chiri
 Battle of Rahon (1710)
 Battle of Kapuri
 Battle of Jammu
 Battle of Jalalabad (1710)
 Battle of Thanesar (1710)
 Battle of Lohgarh
 Battle of Gurdas Nangal or Siege of Gurdaspur

References

Indian Sikhs
18th-century Indian people